Bomberman Hardball (Bomberman Battles in Japan) is a video game for the PlayStation 2 which takes a departure from the previous games in the Bomberman series, and throws in sports games along with the traditional battle mode.

Gameplay
Bomberman Hardball is divided into four games. Battle mode (the standard Bomberman game), is joined by tennis, golf and baseball games. At the center of all this is the Living mode, a character building feature in which the player can design a Bomberman for use in any of the battle modes.

Battle mode
Battle Mode is the centerpiece of this and all other Bomberman games. This mode is essentially the standard Bomberman formula; in the game, players navigate grid-based mazes, planting bombs in an attempt to hit other players (while avoided being hit by a bomb themselves).  There are several different variations of Battle Mode, although they all center around the standard Bomberman gameplay.

 Classic Battle: A standard deathmatch-type game.
 Star Battle: Collect the most stars.
 Crown Battle: Find the crown in the level to win the game.
 Point Battle: Earn the most points by killing opponents
 Replay: Watched game sessions saved to memory card.

Baseball
Baseball has two modes: a single-match mode (exhibition) and a pennant race in which the player takes part in a league match of thirty games against five CPU teams. Aiming is automatic, causing most of the gameplay to revolve around well-timed button presses (baserunning is also automatic; fielding can even be set to be automatic).

Golf
Golf can either be played in exhibition mode or in a tournament mode, with a total of eighteen holes available. Like Mario Golf, shots are handled with a timer bar at the bottom of the screen. A vertical bar moves along the horizontal one; a button press stops the bar, determining the power of the shot. The bar then moves in the opposite direction, eventually passing a stationary bar. A second button press stops the moving bar again; the closer it is to the stationary bar, the more accurate (i.e. straight) the shot will be.

Tennis
Tennis has doubles and singles modes on clay, hard and grass courts. You can play through an exhibition match, selecting the number of sets and games, or you can try out the tournament where you play against a series of opponents.

Living
In living mode, the player can raise a white Bomberman, who lives in his own house. Within the house are several interactive objects, including a television. To get to these interactive objects, you open the remote. The remote options are as follows:

Channel 1: Watch a battle.
Channel 2: Watch some baseball.
Channel 3: Watch some tennis.
Channel 4: Watch some golf.
Channel 5: Edit your Bomberman character.
Channel 6: Go to the options menu.
Channel 7: Display calendar.
Channel 8: Name your Bomberman character.
Channel 9: Buy things from the gumball machine.

The TV can be used to watch demos of matches (computer-only matches) from the game's different modes.  There is also a gumball machine, which allows the player to spend 100 coins on things such as outfits for the player's Bomberman (coins are earned by playing the main game modes, and items are chosen at random). The player's customized Bomberman can be used in any battle mode.

Reception

References

External links
Hudson Soft page
Ubisoft (UK) page
Ubisoft blasts off Hudson's new and improved Bomberman in Europe and North America

2004 video games
Hardball
PlayStation 2 games
PlayStation 2-only games
Multiplayer and single-player video games
RenderWare games
Video games developed in Japan
Ubisoft games
Party video games
Puzzle video games
Hudson Soft games